Le Pacha (foaled in 1938) was a Champion French Thoroughbred racehorse. Bred by Andre Schwob, his dam was Advertencia, a daughter of two-time Arc winner, Ksar. He was sired by Biribi who won the 1926 Prix de l'Arc de Triomphe and who was a son of the three-time Leading sire in France, Rabelais.

Raced by Philippe Gund, Le Pacha was trained by John Cunnington whose family founded the English Racing Colony in Chantilly, Oise. The dominant three-year-old in wartime France in 1941, Le Pacha went undefeated while winning the preeminent races for his age group, the Prix du Jockey Club and the then 3,000 meter Grand Prix de Paris. He followed these important wins by defeating older horses in winning the Prix de l'Arc de Triomphe, thus becoming the first of only two horses to ever win all three of the French Classic Races open to colts.

In 1942, Le Pacha's best results were a win in the Prix du Prince d'Orange and a second to Djebel in the Grand Prix de Saint-Cloud. Retired to stud duty, he met with modest success as a sire while standing at Prince Aly Khan's Haras de Saint-Crespin near Le Mesnil-Mauger in Lower Normandy.

References
 Le Pacha's pedigree and partial racing stats

1938 racehorse births
Racehorses bred in France
Racehorses trained in France
Arc winners
Thoroughbred family 16